Jazz Forum was a British-based "quarterly review of jazz and literature" founded and edited by Albert J. McCarthy (1920–1987) and published by the Delphic Press from 1946 — surviving only five issues until 1947. According to the jazz writers Peter Clayton and Peter Gammond, the publication offered good features by distinguished contributors. It was a short-lived but highly acclaimed experiment in linking jazz, poetry, literature, and graphic art in a post-World War II avant-garde British era. Several of the contributors were among the foremost Beat and modern writers of the time. The graphic art was also forward. The publication had useful discographies of then under-rated musicians.  Contributors to the first 32-page issue included Stanley Dance, Charles Delaunay, Langston Hughes, Hugues Panassie, Roger Pryor Dodge in a mix of poetry and book reviews.

References 

1946 establishments in the United Kingdom
1947 disestablishments in the United Kingdom
Music magazines published in the United Kingdom
Quarterly magazines published in the United Kingdom
Defunct magazines published in the United Kingdom
Jazz magazines
Magazines established in 1946
Magazines disestablished in 1947